Inokovka is a settlement in Rzhaksinsky District of Tambov Oblast,  Russia.

References

Rural localities in Tambov Oblast